Nallam Venkataramayya (Andhra "నాలం వెంకట రామయ్యా") (born 4 September 1943) is an Indian physician and surgeon. He is the director of Clinic Nallam, a medical center in Pondicherry, India.

Early life
Venkataramayya was born at Mummidivaram on 4 September 1943. Nallam Satiyanarayana, his father was a surgeon in the Government Hospital Pondicherry and the founder President of the Andhra Maha Sabha in Pondicherry. Venkataramayya had his primary Education in the French Cluny School and graduation at (Maths) in French college in 1961. Later, he did medicine at Pondicherry Medical College and graduated in 1966. After a short stay at JIPMER he did his post graduation M.S (General Surgery) at Stanley medical college during 1969–71.

Career
Venkataramayya joined Government general hospital as surgeon in July 1971. He was selected by the Government of India for specialized training in cancer in 1979 and was sent to France. He worked for one year in the Cancer Institute in Viljuife, France where he completed his thesis in Treatment of Cheek cancer.

Posts and honors
He is actively involved in many philanthropical ventures which involve running free dispensaries in his own Clinic Nallam and organising medical camps. In November 1996, he led a delegation consisting of the representatives of both the French Consulate and Andhra Maha Sabha to distribute essential commodities to the people of Yanam and surroundings, who were ravaged by the Cyclone. He has also written a book on History of Medicine in French India which is unique as the only available documentation on the subject on both in French and English.

 Recipient of Highest French Award “Chevelier de lelégion d’honneur”
 President, Friends of Pondicherry Heritage Association], Pondicherry.
 Life president, Andhra Maha Sabha, Pondicherry.
 Surgical expert of French Consulate, Pondicherry Médecin Counseil
 President, Private Hospitals Association, Pondicherry.
 Co-researcher of Genetic studies of Polymorphisms in ten non-insulin-dependent diabetes mellitus candidate genes in Tamil Indians from Pondicherry.

References

1943 births
Living people
Indian cardiac surgeons
20th-century Indian medical doctors
People from East Godavari district
Medical doctors from Andhra Pradesh
20th-century surgeons